Willie Lee Rose (May 18, 1927 – June 20, 2018) was an American historian. She was a professor of American History at Johns Hopkins University, and the author of several books about slavery and the Reconstruction Era.

Early life
Rose was born as Willie Lee Nichols on May 18, 1927 in Moneta, Virginia. She grew up in Bedford, Virginia.

Rose graduated from University of Mary Washington, where she earned a bachelor's degree in 1947. She earned a PhD in History from Johns Hopkins University in 1962.

Career
Rose was a history professor at the University of Virginia until 1973, when she returned to Johns Hopkins University as faculty. She was a history professor at Johns Hopkins until 1992. She was the Harold Vyvyan Harmsworth Visiting Professor of American History at the University of Oxford in 1977.

Rose authored several books about slavery and the Reconstruction Era. She won the Allan Nevins Prize and the Francis Parkman Prize from the Society of American Historians and the Troyer Steele Anderson Prize from the American Historical Association in 1991.

Personal life and death
Rose married William G. Rose in 1949. He predeceased her in 1985.

Rose died on June 20, 2018 in Baltimore, Maryland, at 91.

Selected works

References

1927 births
2018 deaths
People from Bedford, Virginia
University of Mary Washington alumni
20th-century American historians
American women historians
Historians of slavery
Historians of the United States
20th-century American women writers
Historians from Virginia
21st-century American women